The Vernon Parish Courthouse, located at 201 S. 3rd St. in Leesville in Vernon Parish, Louisiana, was built in 1910.  It was listed on the National Register of Historic Places in 1983.

The stuccoed masonry courthouse is Classical Revival in style.  It has four monumental pedimented porticos on the four sides of the building, each in between small wings that project diagonally at each corner, giving the building an "X"-shaped plan.  It has two main floors, and a third floor Baroque domed cupola with a clock on each face.

References

Courthouses on the National Register of Historic Places in Louisiana
Neoclassical architecture in Louisiana
Government buildings completed in 1910
Vernon Parish, Louisiana